The Slovak Open is a darts tournament that has been held in Šamorín since 2018.

Results

Men's

Women's

Boys

Girls

References 
 https://mastercaller.com/tournaments/slovak-open-men Results

External links
 Darts Slovak Open
 https://www.youtube.com/watch?v=VAAhEiNFxbY Darts Slovak Open 2020 at x-bionic® sphere Šamorín Slovakia

Darts tournaments
Sports competitions in Slovakia